Grigorovich, in its original language:, is a patronymic meaning "Son of Grigory" and may refer to:

People

Dmitry Grigorovich (1822–1900), a Russian writer
Dmitry Pavlovich Grigorovich (1883–1938), a Soviet aircraft designer
Ivan Grigorovich (1853–1930), a Russian admiral
Ivan Grigorovich-Barsky (1713–1785), a Ukrainian architect
Grigorovich, Konstantin Petrovich (1886–1939), one of the founders of the Soviet electrometallurgy
Victor Grigorovich (1815–1876), a Russian Slavonic scholar
Yury Grigorovich (born 1927), Russian balletmaster, dancer and choreographer

Other
Grigorovich, a Soviet aircraft design bureau

Russian-language surnames
Surnames from given names